Karla Cossío (born June 22, 1985, in Cuba) is a Mexican actress.

Born in Cuba and brought to Mexico when she was only three months old , Karla Cossío began performing very young. She studied acting at the age of 15 in the CEAI (Centro de Educación Artística Infantil) and later in the CEA (Centro de Educación Artística).

She attended elementary school Colegio Ciudad de México, Junior High and the High School in El Colegio Britanico (The Edron Academy). She is also fluent three languages: Spanish, English and French. Cossío was part of the soap opera Clase 406 with the character of Sandra Paola, a production of Pedro Damián.

In 2004 she acts in the soap opera Rebelde with the character of Pilar.

Television roles
 Clase 406 (2002) - Sandra Paola Rodríguez Pineda
 Rebelde (2004) - Pilar Gandía
 Lola...Érase una vez (2007) - Paloma
 Alma de Hierro (2009) - Cinthya
 Como dice el dicho (2013) - Aurora
 Rebelde (2022) - Pilar Gandía

External links
 
 Karla Cossío
 Revista Fama

1985 births
Living people
Mexican telenovela actresses
Cuban emigrants to Mexico
Cossio Karla